Robert Andrew Ri'chard (born January 7, 1983) is an American television and film actor, known for his roles as Arnaz Ballard on the UPN sitcom One on One and Bobby Walker on the Nickelodeon sitcom Cousin Skeeter.

Early life
Ri'chard was born in Los Angeles, California. He is of Louisiana Creole descent.

Career
He has starred in the Nickelodeon sitcom Cousin Skeeter. He also made a few appearances as himself on the hit Nickelodeon game show, Figure It Out. He played Samuel on Touched By An Angel, a troubled teen whose brother is in prison for shooting a man. Also, he has appeared in films such as Coach Carter and House of Wax. His breakout role was in the TV adaptation of Anne Rice's novel, The Feast of All Saints, where he played the young Marcel who becomes a man within society. He has been professionally acting since the age of 13. He appeared in the movie Light It Up along with R&B star Usher. He attended Palms Middle School in Los Angeles, California.

Ri'chard has guest starred on many hit shows such as Boston Public, Touched by an Angel, NCIS, CSI: Miami, CSI: NY, My Wife and Kids, and The Jamie Foxx Show. In 2000, he starred in the Disney Channel TV movie Alley Cats Strike. Ri'chard has appeared in the 2006 season of Veronica Mars. In 1997, Ri'chard starred in the television special, In His Father's Shoes, which earned him the 1998 Daytime Emmy Award for Outstanding Performer in a Children's Special. He became popular in 2001 when he got the role of Arnaz Ballard on the UPN hit sitcom One on One alongside Flex Alexander and Kyla Pratt. That role was the most significant of his television roles. He continued to play the role until the show ended in 2006.

In the sitcom Meet the Browns, he portrayed Derek Porter, a buffoonish frat student who lived next door to Brown Meadows. He often provided service to Brown Meadows, and was often either the mastermind or participant in Brown's antics. He debuted in season 3 as a recurring character, and in the fourth season, was promoted to a main character.
Ri’chard was considered for the role of Barry Frost in Rizzoli & Isles but the role was given to Lee Thompson Young.

Ri'chard was set to star in a new series entitled Eight Days a Week, starring Christina Milian and Mario Lopez on the CW Television Network during the fall 2007 season, but it was canceled due to the 2007 Writers Strike before airing. On November 16, 2011, it was announced that Robert Ri'chard was cast as Jamie in the TV series The Vampire Diaries.

Filmography

Film

Television

References

External links

1983 births
African-American male actors
Alexander Hamilton High School (Los Angeles) alumni
American male child actors
American male film actors
American male television actors
American people of French descent
American people who self-identify as being of Native American descent
American people of Spanish descent
Living people
Louisiana Creole people of Spanish descent
Male actors from Los Angeles
20th-century African-American people
21st-century African-American people